Joxantonio Ormazabal  (1948–2010) was a Basque and Spanish author of primarily children's literature in the Basque language. He also published under the pen name of Joxean.

Early life 
Joxantonio Ormazabal was born in 1948 to a Basque family in Zegama, a part of the Basque Autonomous Community of Spain. At the age of 12, he joined a seminary in Saturrarán, and later studied at a seminary in San Sebastián. He later left the seminary to become a teacher. In an interview with Argia magazine in 2009, he stated, "I do not remember reading tales. My mother told me stories. I remember the characters of Peru and María, but I did not grow up among books."

Career 
At the age of 23, Ormazabal became a teacher at a private school called  in Zarautz. His first book was published under the pen name "Joxean".

Ormazabal later taught at Alkartasuna High School in Beasain.

Ormazabal left teaching and became an editor at Elkarlanean Publishing House in 1981, where he worked in the field of children's and young people's literary collections as well as textbooks. He published his first work, Fernando Smezketarra. In addition to writing, Ormazabal was responsible for the children and youth departments at Elkar Publishing House until his supposed retirement in 2009. He continued his work in children's literature by editing and occasionally translating important works.

Ormazabal's prose work focused on humor and fantasy. Also, Ormazabal published works tackling topics such as freedom (Kaiolatik Mendira, 1986), poverty, and discrimination (Kittano, 1995), relations between grandparents and grandchildren (Aitona parapentean, 2004), and ecology (Txoria zezenaren adar gainean, 1999).

Poetry played a prominent role in Ormazabal's body of work. He was a finalist in the Euskadi Literary Prize for Children and Youth Literature in 2008 for the poem 'Ilunorduak eta Argilaurdenak' (2007).

Ormazabal's titles include Zirkua amets (2009), Kaskarintxo (1983), Margolin (1983), Pernando Amezketarra (1981), and Kittano.

Death 
Ormazabal died on 2 May 2010 in Zegama, Spain, after falling into a well. His body was found at the vent of the Oazurza tunnel on the Madrid-Irún railway line.

Books 
Ehun ipuin hitz gutxitan Donostia: Elkar, D.L. 2010. , 
Aitona eta amona udalekuetan Donostia: Elkar, 2008 
Ilunorduak eta argilaurdenak Donostia Elkarlanean, 2007. , 
Aitona parapentean  (2004, Elkar)
Antonio Bolas (2002, Elkar)
Hiztegi jolastia  (2002, Elkar)
Bihotza zubi Donostia: Elkarlanean, L.G. 2001. , 
Josebiñe  (2001, Elkar)
Irri eta barre  (2001, Elkar)
Kotti  (2001, Elkar)
Amona Bizikletan (2000, Elkar)
Bi indar txiki inauterietan  (2000, Elkar)
Koxmeren gezurrak (2000, Elkar)
Helikopteroa ikastolan  (2000, Elkar)
Gorritxo eta Beltxiko  (2000, Elkar)
Amona Bizikletan  (2000, Elkar)
Txoria zezenaren adar gainean  (1999, Elkar)
Saturna  (1999, Elkar)
Patxibusa  (1998, Elkar)
Azenalian erraldoia (1998, Elkar)
Nola ibili munduan, ohetik jaiki gabe  (1998, Elkar)
Txoko txiki txukuna (1998, Elkar)
Olentzeroren oparia (1998, Elkar)
Haizemari (1998, Elkar)
Zipriztin (1996, Elkar)
Lazkao Txiki  (1995, Elkar
Kittano  (1995, Elkar)
Hitzak jostailu  (1994, Elkar)
Pernando Amezketarra  (1994, Elkar)
Esaera zaharrak eta txiste berriak  (1994, Elkar)
Maripertxenta  (1993, Elkar)
Esaera zaharrak  (1990, Elkar)
Txisteak  (1990, Elkar)
Igarkizunak  (1990, Elkar)
Kiriko eta bere sendia  (1989, Elkar)
Honela bizi naiz ni  (1986, Elkar)
Auto, asto train  (1986, Elkar)
Kaiolatik mendira  (1986, Elkar)
Margolin  (1983, Elkar)

Translations

Joles egiteko ipuinak (Gianni Rodari)
Ilargia edan zuen astoa (Renata Mathieu)
Tone, haria eta armiarma (Antoni Cuadrench)
Koloreak (Enric Larreula)
Izei txikia (M. Eulàlia Valeri)
Mister Daffodil eta bere denda (Asun Balzola)

References

External links
 

1948 births
2010 deaths
Spanish children's writers
Basque-language writers
People from Goierri
Spanish schoolteachers